Rita Bottiglieri (born 29 June 1953 in Torre del Greco, Naples, Italy) is a former sprinter and pentathlete from Italy.

Biography
She won three medals at the European Indoor Championships. Rita Bottiglieri, dubbed by the press "the athlete anywhere," was eclectic athlete: in 1976, ranking on nine seasonal Italian specialties, in first place in five.

Achievements

National titles
Rita Bottiglieri has won nine times the individual national championship.

 3 wins on 100 metres (1975, 1976, 1977)
 3 wins on 200 metres (1975, 1976, 1977)
 2 wins on 200 metres indoor (1975, 1978)
 1 win on pentathlon indoor (1974)

See also
 Italy national relay team
 Italian all-time lists - 400 metres hurdles

References

External links
 

1953 births
Living people
Italian female sprinters
Italian female pentathletes
Athletes (track and field) at the 1976 Summer Olympics
Olympic athletes of Italy
People from Torre del Greco
Mediterranean Games gold medalists for Italy
Mediterranean Games silver medalists for Italy
Mediterranean Games medalists in athletics
Athletes (track and field) at the 1975 Mediterranean Games
Olympic female sprinters
Sportspeople from the Province of Naples